The 2023 FIA Formula 2 Championship is a motor racing championship for Formula 2 cars that is sanctioned by the Fédération Internationale de l'Automobile (FIA). The championship is the fifty-seventh season of Formula 2 racing and the seventh season run under the FIA Formula 2 Championship moniker. It is an open-wheel racing category that serves as the second tier of formula racing in the FIA Global Pathway. The category is run in support of selected rounds of the 2023 FIA Formula One World Championship. As the championship is a spec series, all teams and drivers that compete in the championship run the same car, the Dallara F2 2018.

2023 is the final season using the Dallara F2 2018 chassis and Mecachrome V634T 3.4-litre V6 single-turbocharged engine package which debuted in the 2018 season. A brand new chassis and engine package will be introduced for the 2024 season onwards.

MP Motorsport entered the championship as the reigning teams' champion, having secured their title at the final round of the 2022 season in Abu Dhabi.

Entries 
The following teams and drivers are under contract to compete in the 2023 championship. As the championship is a spec series, all competitors race with an identical Dallara F2 2018 chassis with a V6 turbo engine developed by Mecachrome. Teams compete with tyres supplied by Pirelli.

Team changes 
German Formula 4 team PHM Racing took over the entry and assets of Charouz Racing System at the end of the 2022 season, and runs in cooperation with the Czech squad under the PHM Racing by Charouz moniker.

Carlin compete under new ownership in 2023. The New Zealand-based car manufacturer Rodin Cars became majority shareholder of the team. With that, the team is now called Rodin Carlin.

Hitech partnered with hardware company Pulse-Eight during the off-season, changing the official name of the team to Hitech Pulse-Eight.

Virtuosi Racing and the Invicta Watch Group announced a multi-year strategic partnership that saw the name of the team change to Invicta Virtuosi Racing.

Driver changes 
Reigning team champion MP Motorsport debuted a new lineup: Reigning champion Felipe Drugovich left the series whilst Clément Novalak left the team after coming fourteenth with them. The team signed the driver lineup that competed for Prema Racing in 2022: 2021 FIA Formula 3 champion Dennis Hauger, who came tenth with Prema in his rookie season, and Jehan Daruvala, who came seventh and embarked on his fourth season in the championship.

Carlin saw both their drivers departing the championship, with Logan Sargeant graduating to Formula One with Williams and Liam Lawson moving to the Super Formula Championship to compete with Red Bull-affiliated Team Mugen. The team consists of two Red Bull junior drivers in 2023: Enzo Fittipaldi moved over from Charouz and Zane Maloney embarked on his first full-time Formula 2 season after debuting in the 2022 finale with Trident.

ART driver Frederik Vesti left the team and joined Prema Racing. Victor Martins replaced him, stepping up to ART's Formula 2 squad after winning the 2022 FIA Formula 3 Championship with the same team.

Prema Racing replaced their MP-bound driver pairing of Dennis Hauger and Jehan Daruvala with Ferrari Driver Academy member Oliver Bearman, who finished third in the 2022 FIA Formula 3 Championship, and Frederik Vesti, who returned to Prema after finishing ninth in his rookie season in Formula 2 with ART Grand Prix.

Hitech Pulse-Eight is another team that has an all-Red Bull lineup in 2023. The team signed Isack Hadjar, fourth in FIA Formula 3 in 2022 with the same outfit, and Jak Crawford, who returned to Hitech after last competing for them in the 2021 FIA Formula 3 Championship and coming seventh with Prema in F3 in 2022. Marcus Armstrong left the series after three seasons and moved to Chip Ganassi Racing in IndyCar.

DAMS signed Ferrari Driver Academy member Arthur Leclerc, who stepped up to Formula 2 after two seasons in FIA Formula 3 with Prema, with a best result of sixth in the standings. He replaced PHM-bound Roy Nissany.

Invicta Virtuosi Racing did not rehire Marino Sato and instead signed Amaury Cordeel, who came 17th in his debut Formula 2 season with Van Amersfoort Racing in 2022. Sato left the championship to join United Autosports in the European Le Mans Series.

Newly formed team PHM Racing by Charouz retained none of Charouz's drivers; Carlin-bound Enzo Fittipaldi was replaced by Roy Nissany, who started his fifth Formula 2 season after coming 19th with DAMS last season. The teams' second seat was filled by Brad Benavides, who graduates from FIA Formula 3 after finishing the 2022 season in 23rd whilst driving for Carlin.

Trident also replaced both their drivers: Clément Novalak returned to the team after last competing for the Italian squad in the 2021 FIA Formula 3 Championship. He partners Roman Staněk, who graduated from Formula 3 finishing fifth in the standings, also driving for Trident. Calan Williams left the series and joined WRT in the GT World Challenge Europe, while Richard Verschoor joined Van Amersfoort Racing for his third season. 

Partnering Verschoor at Van Amersfoort Racing is Juan Manuel Correa, who made his full-time return to the championship after his injury in the crash that took Anthoine Hubert's life in 2019. The pair replaced Jake Hughes, who left the series to join McLaren for the 2022-23 Formula E World Championship after already ending his 2022 campaign prematurely to focus on securing a Formula E seat, and Virtuosi-bound Cordeel.

Campos Racing's Olli Caldwell moved to endurance racing to compete with the Alpine Elf Matmut team in the LMP2 class of the FIA World Endurance Championship. His seat was filled by Kush Maini, who moves up to Formula 2 after a single year of FIA Formula 3 in which he came 14th.

Race calendar

Calendar changes 
 The FIA Formula 2 championship is scheduled to make its debut in Australia, supporting the Australian Grand Prix at the Albert Park Circuit.
 The Circuit Paul Ricard will not feature on the calendar due to the French Grand Prix not taking place in 2023.

Regulation changes

Technical regulations 
Formula 2 and Formula 3 run with 55% sustainable fuel in 2023, supplied by Aramco, who replaced Elf Aquitaine as an official fuel partner and supplier. In a bid to decrease the championships' carbon footprint, an incremental gain in usage is planned until the 2027 season, where usage of 100% sustainable fuel is planned.

Season report

Round 1: Bahrain
The first feature race pole position of the season was claimed by ART Grand Prix driver Théo Pourchaire in qualifying at the Bahrain International Circuit. Campos Racing's Ralph Boschung started first in the reverse-grid sprint race having qualified tenth. Boschung held the lead for the entire race, finishing ahead of second-placed Dennis Hauger, who had started sixth.

Collisions on the opening lap of the feature race necessitated the deployment of the safety car and eliminated Frederik Vesti, Victor Martins and Roman Staněk from the race, whilst Boschung took advantage of the retirements to improve from tenth at the start to second by lap four, a position he kept for the remainder of the race. Zane Maloney, who had started eighteenth, made numerous overtakes in the closing laps to complete the podium in third place. Pole-sitter Pourchaire won the race to claim his sixth victory in Formula 2 and the lead of the Drivers' Championship, four points ahead of Boschung.

Round 2: Saudi Arabia
ART Grand Prix's Victor Martins qualified fastest at the Jeddah Corniche Circuit with Hitech Pulse-Eight driver Jak Crawford starting first in the sprint race. Crawford lost the lead to DAMS driver Ayumu Iwasa on the second lap and would ultimately drop outside of the points positions by the end of the race. The safety car was deployed twice, firstly when Zane Maloney spun and stalled on track and secondly when championship leader Pourchaire collided with Oliver Bearman during a botched overtake attempt. Iwasa took the victory, his third in Formula 2, having fought off challenges for the lead from Martins, who started tenth, and Jehan Daruvala.

Pole-sitter Martins lost the lead of the feature race to Bearman immediately at the start. Sixth-place Frederik Vesti gained two places at the start and gained third place from Jack Doohan during the pit stops. Bearman and Martins continued to fight for the lead and Martins reclaimed the position on lap eleven; the battle soon allowed Vesti to gain second place from Bearman, who spun a few laps later and would ultimately finish tenth. Martins then spun and was unable to restart his car, allowing Vesti to claim his second Formula 2 race win. Round 2 ended with Ralph Boschung leading the Drivers' Championship by one point over Pourchaire.

Results and standings

Season summary

Scoring system 
Points are awarded to the top eight classified finishers in the sprint race, and to the top ten classified finishers in the feature race. The pole-sitter in the feature race also receives two points, and one point is given to the driver who sets the fastest lap in both the feature and sprint races if that driver finishes inside the top ten. No point is awarded if the fastest lap time is achieved by a driver who is classified outside the top ten. No extra points are awarded to the pole-sitter in the sprint race as the grid for it is set by reversing the top ten qualifiers.

 Sprint race points

Points are awarded to the top eight classified finishers, excluding the fastest lap point which is given to the top ten classified finishers.

 Feature race points

Points are awarded to the top ten classified finishers. Bonus points are awarded to the pole-sitter and to the driver who sets the fastest lap and finishes in the top ten.

Drivers' championship

Teams' championship 

Notes: 
 Rows are not related to the drivers: within each team, individual race standings are sorted purely based on the final classification in the race (not by total points scored in the event, which includes points awarded for fastest lap and pole position).<noinclude>

Notes

References

External links 
 FIA Formula 2 Championship official website

FIA Formula 2 Championship seasons
 
FIA Formula 2
FIA_Formula_2_Championship